Bankapura is a panchayat town in Haveri district in the state of Karnataka, India. It is in Shiggaon taluk, is just 2.5 km from the Pune-Bangalore national highway NH-4, 22 km from Haveri town. Bankapura is about 45 km from Hubli-Dharwad. An historical site, Bankapura is famous for the Nagareshwara temple, Bankapura fort, The Bankapura Peacock Sanctuary. Baada, the birthplace of Kanakadasa is near to Bankapura.

History

Under the Chalukyas, many temples were built here, but during the invasion of Ali Adilshahi in about 1565 most of the temples were destroyed. A fort, now in ruins, at Bankapura houses the Ranganatha Nagareshwara temple, which has 66 pillars carved out of grey stone. There is also a mosque in the fort. The place is of historical significance to Jains. Adipuran, a Jain religious text was composed here.
Bankapura fort (454 AD), was ruled by Kadamba of Banavasi, Gangas, Cholas, Rashtrakutas, Hoysalas, Chalukyas, Kings of Vijayanagar, Adilshahi of Bijapur, Hyder Ali and Tipu Sultan. 
During the 9th century, Bankapura was named after Bankeyarasa (in 898 CE) who was a feudatory of Rashtrakoota king Amoghavarsha I. 
In the 11th century the Kadambas took over, followed by the Hoysalas king Vishnuvardhana.

Invasion by the Bahamanis 
In the 16th century, the Bahamanis attacked Bankapur and Mustapha Khan of Bijapur annexed the fortress after a pitched battle for more than a year. The Nawabs of Savanur and the Marathas ruled for a short duration before Hyder Ali and Tipu took possession. Later, Bankapura was ceded to the British.

Inscriptions

In the Nagareshwara temple, at the entrance to the mukhamantapa, there are large clear inscriptions written in old Kannada.

It is known from history that the great poet of Kannada literature, Ranna, visited Bankapur to meet Ajithsenacharya, who became his teacher.

Bankapur Fort

Inside the ruined Bankapura fort, conquered by the Bahamanis, there is a temple built by the Chalukyas known as Aravattaru Kambada Gudi. Bankapura is an important historical place where many battles were fought by a succession of rulers. In spite of the vandalism the Nagareshwara temple remains ornate.

Nagareshwar temple

The impressive Bankapur fort area has the eye catching 66 pillared Nagareshwar temple (locals call it as Aravattu Kambada Gudi - means 60 pillars temple in Kannada) was built (in a depression to conceal it from invaders) in the 11th century in Chalukya style (in a depression). There are many well carved pillars. As per the 16 inscriptions, has references to the history of this place, it was dedicated to Shiva. The temple also once it was a centre  for study and research on Jainism. During rule of Mustafa Khan the temple, the back corners of the temple hall completely damaged including number of carvings in the exterior wall panels 
but the pillars, the artistic carvings and the ceiling designs are intact.

The peacock sanctuary

Bankapura is a conservation reserve for peacocks by the Government of India.

Demographics
 India census, Bankapura had a population of 20,264. Males constitute 53% of the population and females 47%. Bankapur has an average literacy rate of 59%, lower than the national average of 59.5%; with 58% of the males and 42% of females literate. 14% of the population is under 6 years of age.

External links

 Bankapura Fort on Google Maps

References

Chalukya dynasty
Western Chalukya Empire
Forts in Karnataka
Bird sanctuaries of Karnataka
Cities and towns in Haveri district